Gregory Benford (born January 30, 1941) is an American science fiction author and astrophysicist who is professor emeritus at the Department of Physics and Astronomy at the University of California, Irvine. He is a contributing editor of Reason magazine.

Benford wrote the Galactic Center Saga science fiction novels, beginning with In the Ocean of Night (1977).  The series postulates a galaxy in which sentient organic life is in constant warfare with sentient electromechanical life.

In 1969 he wrote "The Scarred Man", the first story about a computer virus, published in 1970.

Biography 
Benford was born in Mobile, Alabama and grew up in Robertsdale and Fairhope. Graduating Phi Beta Kappa, he received a Bachelor of Science in physics in 1963 from the University of Oklahoma in Norman, Oklahoma, followed by a Master of Science from the University of California, San Diego in 1965, and a doctorate there in 1967. That same year he married Joan Abbe, with whom he had two children. Benford modeled characters in several of his novels after his wife, most prominently the heroine of Artifact. She died in 2002.

Benford has an identical twin brother, James (Jim) Benford, with whom he has collaborated on science fiction stories. Both got their start in science fiction fandom, with Gregory being a co-editor of the science fiction fanzine Void. Benford has said he is an atheist.

He has been a long-time resident of Laguna Beach, California.

Writing career 
Gregory Benford's first professional sale was the story "Stand-In" in the Magazine of Fantasy and Science Fiction (June 1965), which won second prize in a short story contest based on a poem by Doris Pitkin Buck. In 1969, he began writing a science column for Amazing Stories.

Benford tends to write hard science fiction which incorporates the research he is doing as a practical scientist.  He has worked on collaborations with authors William Rotsler, David Brin and Gordon Eklund. His time-travel novel Timescape (1980) won both the Nebula Award and the John W. Campbell Memorial Award.  The scientific procedural novel eventually loaned its title to a line of science fiction published by Pocket Books. In the late 1990s, he wrote Foundation's Fear, one of an authorized sequel trilogy to Isaac Asimov's Foundation series.  Other novels published in that period include several near-future science thrillers: Cosm (1998), The Martian Race (1999) and Eater (2000).

Benford has served as an editor of numerous alternate history anthologies as well as collections of Hugo Award winners.

He has been nominated for four Hugo Awards (for two short stories and two novellas) and 12 Nebula Awards (in all categories).  In addition to Timescape, he won the Nebula for the novelette "If the Stars Are Gods" (with Eklund). In 2005 the MIT SF Society awarded him the Asimov Prize.

Benford was a guest of honour at Aussiecon Three, the 1999 Worldcon. He remains a regular contributor to science fiction fanzines, for example Apparatchik (defunct as of 1997).

In 2016 Benford was the recipient of the Los Angeles Science Fantasy Society Forry Award Lifetime Achievement Award in the Field of Science Fiction.

Contributions to science and speculative science 

Gregory Benford is Professor Emeritus of Physics at the University of California, Irvine.  With more than 200 scientific publications, his research encompassed both theory and experiments in the fields of astrophysics and plasma physics. His research has been supported by NSF, NASA, AFOSR, DOE and other agencies. He is an ongoing advisor to NASA, DARPA (Defense Advanced Research Projects Agency) and the CIA.

Benford's work in physics at the University of California focused on theoretical and experimental plasma physics, including studies of extremely strong turbulence, particularly in astrophysical contexts, and studies of magnetic structures from the Galactic Center to large-scale galactic jets.  Working in collaboration with, among others, science fiction writers Cramer, Forward, and Landis, Benford worked on a theoretical study of the physics of wormholes, which pointed out that wormholes, if formed in the early universe, could still exist in the present day if they were wrapped in a negative-mass cosmic string.  Such wormholes could potentially be detected by gravitational lensing.

In 2004, Benford proposed that the harmful effects of global warming could be reduced by the construction of a rotating Fresnel lens 1,000 kilometres across, floating in space at the Lagrangian point L1. According to Benford, this lens would diffuse the light from the Sun and reduce the solar energy reaching the Earth by approximately 0.5% to 1%. He estimated that this would cost around US$10 billion. His plan has been commented on in a variety of forums. A similar space sunshade was proposed in 1989 by J. T. Early, and again in 1997 by Edward Teller, Lowell Wood, and Roderick Hyde. In 2006, Benford pointed out one possible danger in this approach: if this lens were built and global warming were avoided, there would be less incentive to reduce greenhouse gases, and humans might continue to produce too much carbon dioxide until it caused some other environmental catastrophe, such as a chemical change in ocean water that could be disastrous to ocean life.

Benford serves on the board of directors and the steering committee of the Mars Society.

He has advocated human cryopreservation, for example by signing an open letter to support research into cryonics, being a member of Alcor, and by being an advisor to a UK cryonics and cryopreservation advocacy group.

Gregory Benford retired from the University of California in 2006 in order to found and develop Genescient Corporation. Genescient is a new generation biotechnology company that combines evolutionary genomics with massive selective screening to analyze and exploit the genetics of model animal and human whole genomes. This enables Genescient to develop novel therapeutics that target the chronic diseases of aging.

Scientific awards and recognition

Phi Beta Kappa
Woodrow Wilson Fellow
Fellow of the American Physical Society
Visiting Fellow
Cambridge University
University of Turin
University of Bologna.
1995 Lord Prize for contributions to science
2006 Professor Emeritus at the University of California, Irvine

Benford's law of controversy

Benford's law of controversy is an adage from the 1980 novel Timescape, stating:

The adage was quoted in an international drug policy article in a peer-reviewed social science journal.

Selected bibliography

Galactic Center Saga

 In the Ocean of Night (1977)
 Across the Sea of Suns (1984)
 Great Sky River (1987)
 Tides of Light (1989)
 Furious Gulf (1994)
 Sailing Bright Eternity (1996)
 "A Hunger for the Infinite" a novella published in the 1999 anthology Far Horizons

References

External links

 Gregory Benford official website 
 
 
 
 Giant rotating space lens, a possible engineering solution for global warming proposed by Benford in 2004
 "Terraforming Ganymede with Robert A. Heinlein"  by Gregory Benford: part 1, part 2
 Homepage at UCI
 List of works at Fantastic Fiction
 "Killer Bs" (Brin, Benford, Bear, Baxter and B-, er, Vinge) mailing list
 2012 Interview at Locus (magazine)
 The Gregory Benford Papers (74.25 linear feet) housed at the Eaton Collection of Science Fiction and Fantasy of the University of California, Riverside Libraries.

1941 births
20th-century American novelists
20th-century American male writers
21st-century American male writers
21st-century American novelists
21st-century American physicists
American atheists
American astronomers
American libertarians
American male novelists
American science fiction writers
Cryonicists
Fellows of Jesus College, Cambridge
Life extensionists
Living people
Mars Society
Nebula Award winners
Novelists from Alabama
People from Robertsdale, Alabama
People from Fairhope, Alabama
People from Laguna Beach, California
People from Orange County, California
Science fiction critics
The Magazine of Fantasy & Science Fiction people
University of California, San Diego alumni
University of California, Irvine faculty
Writers from Mobile, Alabama
Fellows of the American Physical Society